The Dina Feitelson Research Award is an award established in 1997 by the International Reading Association to honor the memory of Dina Feitelson, the Israeli educator, who died in 1992.

Criteria for award
The award recognizes an outstanding empirical study published in English in a refereed journal. The work should report on one or more aspects of literacy acquisition, such as phonemic awareness, the alphabetic principle, bilingualism, or cross-cultural studies of beginning reading.

Works may be submitted by the author or anyone else.

List of recipients

References

External links
International Reading Association website
Research Prize by the International Literacy Association in honor of Dina Feitelson

American awards
Education awards
Awards established in 1997
Lists of award winners
Literacy-related awards